William Patrick "Rebel" McTigue (June 3, 1891 – May 8, 1920) was a pitcher in Major League Baseball. He played two seasons with the Boston Rustlers / Braves from 1911 to 1912 and one season with the Detroit Tigers in 1916. On August 23, 1918, it was reported that McTigue had a terminal lung disease and he had only days to live. He died over 20 months later on May 8, 1920.

References

External links

Major League Baseball pitchers
Boston Rustlers players
Boston Braves players
Detroit Tigers players
Haverhill Hustlers players
New Bedford Whalers (baseball) players
Montreal Royals players
Buffalo Bisons (minor league) players
Toronto Maple Leafs (International League) players
Providence Grays (minor league) players
Atlanta Crackers players
Baseball players from Nashville, Tennessee
1891 births
1920 deaths
Deaths from lung disease